Arravonitsa is a village and a community in the municipal unit of Erineos, Achaea, Greece. It is located in a hilly area, 15 km west of Aigio. The community consists of the villages Arravonitsa and Synania. In 2001 Arravonitsa had a population of 166 for the village and 189 for the community.

Population

See also
List of settlements in Achaea

References

External links
 Arravonitsa GTP Travel Pages

Populated places in Achaea
Populated places established in the 17th century